Calvin Peter Savage (born 4 January 1993) is a South African professional cricketer who played for the KwaZulu-Natal Inland. In August 2017, he was named in Benoni Zalmi's squad for the first season of the T20 Global League. However, in October 2017, Cricket South Africa initially postponed the tournament until November 2018, with it being cancelled soon after.

He was the leading run-scorer in the 2017–18 CSA Provincial One-Day Challenge tournament for KwaZulu-Natal, with 263 runs in four matches.

In September 2018, he was named in KwaZulu-Natal's squad for the 2018 Africa T20 Cup. The following month, he was named in Jozi Stars' squad for the first edition of the Mzansi Super League T20 tournament. In September 2019, he was named as the captain of KwaZulu-Natal's squad for the 2019–20 CSA Provincial T20 Cup.

In April 2021, Savage moved to the United States after signing a three-year deal to play cricket. In June 2021, he was selected to take part in the Minor League Cricket tournament in the United States following the players' draft.

References

External links
 

1993 births
Living people
South African cricketers
KwaZulu-Natal Inland cricketers
KwaZulu-Natal cricketers
Dolphins cricketers
Jozi Stars cricketers
Cape Cobras cricketers
Cricketers from Durban